Raul Olle (born 23 January 1968 in Tartu) is an Estonian cross-country skier. He represented Estonia at the 1998 Winter Olympics in Nagano and at the 2002 Winter Olympics in Salt Lake City. In 2000 he also won the Vasaloppet competition.

References

1968 births
Living people
Estonian male cross-country skiers
Cross-country skiers at the 1998 Winter Olympics
Cross-country skiers at the 2002 Winter Olympics
Olympic cross-country skiers of Estonia
Sportspeople from Tartu
20th-century Estonian people